Rubihorn is a mountain of Bavaria, Germany.

Allgäu Alps
Mountains of Bavaria
Mountains of the Alps